Parasoloe is a genus of moths of the family Noctuidae.

Species
 Parasoloe tetrasticta Kiriakoff, 1954

References
Natural History Museum Lepidoptera genus database
Parasoloe at funet

Noctuidae